Coxim Atlético Clube, commonly known as Coxim, is a Brazilian football team based in Coxim, Mato Grosso do Sul state. They won the Campeonato Sul-Mato-Grossense once and competed in the Copa do Brasil once.

History
The club was founded on January 20, 2002. Coxim won the Campeonato Sul-Mato-Grossense in 2006. They competed in the Copa do Brasil in 2007, when they were eliminated in the First Stage by Atlético Parananense.

Achievements

 Campeonato Sul-Mato-Grossense:
 Winners (1): 2006

Stadium
Coxim Atlético Clube play their home games at Estádio André Borges. The stadium has a maximum capacity of 3,500 people.

References

Association football clubs established in 2002
Football clubs in Mato Grosso do Sul
2002 establishments in Brazil